Laurelia is a ghost town in central Polk County, Texas, United States. The town was founded after Judge Claiborne Holshausen built a sawmill in 1880. The location grew into a town and was named for the laurel that dominated the area. The mill remained the nucleus of the town, and after the sawmill burned in 1913, the town dwindled.

References

Geography of Polk County, Texas
Ghost towns in East Texas